The Nicolet North-East River is a tributary of the west bank of the Nicolet Centre River which empties into the Nicolet Southwest River (hydrographic slope of the Nicolet River). It flows into the municipality of Wotton, in the Les Sources Regional County Municipality (MRC), in the administrative region of Estrie, in Quebec, in Canada.

Geography 

The main neighboring hydrographic slopes of the "Nicolet Northeast River" are:
 North side: Nicolet River, Laflamme stream;
 East side: Nicolet River, Turgeon stream;
 South side Nicolet Centre River;
 West side: Nicolet Southwest River.

The Nicolet Nord-Est river has its source in the third rang of the municipality of Saint-Adrien, almost at the limit of Notre-Dame-de-Ham. Its source is located near Chemin du 2e Rang.

The main tributaries of the North-East Nicolet river are the Bissonnette River and the rivière chez Larrivée.

Toponymy 

The toponym "Rivière Nicolet Nord-Est" was made official on December 5, 1968, at the Commission de toponymie du Québec.

See also 
 Lake Saint-Pierre
 List of rivers of Quebec

References 

Rivers of Estrie
Les Sources Regional County Municipality